The Texan is a 1920 American silent Western film directed by Lynn Reynolds and starring Tom Mix. It was produced and released by the Fox Film Company. The story was filmed again in 1930 by Paramount as The Texan with Gary Cooper.

Cast
 Tom Mix as Tex Benton
 Gloria Hope as Alice Marcum
 Robert Walker as Winthrop Endicott
 Charles K. French as Wolf River Mayor
 Sid Jordan as Jack Purdy
 Pat Chrisman as Bat, a Half-Breed

Preservation status
Copies of The Texan are held at Filmmuseum Netherlands aka EYE Institut and The Danish Film Institute.

See also
 List of Fox Film films
 Tom Mix filmography

References

External links

 
 

1920 films
1920 Western (genre) films
American black-and-white films
Films directed by Lynn Reynolds
Fox Film films
Silent American Western (genre) films
1920s American films
1920s English-language films